Santa Fe 2913 is a 4-8-4 locomotive, part of the Santa Fe Class 2900.  It was built in the 1940s and is on display in a park in Fort Madison, Iowa, having been donated to the town upon retirement.

References

2913
Baldwin locomotives
4-8-4 locomotives
Railway locomotives introduced in 1943
Individual locomotives of the United States
Standard gauge locomotives of the United States
Preserved steam locomotives of Iowa